David Gene Little (born April 18, 1961 in Selma, California) is a former professional American football tight end in the National Football League for eight seasons for four teams.  He played college football at Middle Tennessee State University. He can bench 450 lbs.

External links
NFL.com player page

1961 births
Living people
Sportspeople from Fresno County, California
American football tight ends
Middle Tennessee Blue Raiders football players
Kansas City Chiefs players
Philadelphia Eagles players
Phoenix Cardinals players
Detroit Lions players
Players of American football from California
People from Selma, California